Losier is a French surname. Notable people with the surname include:

Denis Losier (born 1952), Canadian businessman, economist and politician
Marie Losier (born 1972), French film director

See also
Losier Settlement, New Brunswick, settlement in New Brunswick, Canada
L'Osier, French cuisine restaurant in Tokyo, Japan

French-language surnames